The men's team was an archery event held as part of the archery at the 2000 Summer Olympics programme.

A total of 14 teams competed in the third appearance of the Olympic team round archery event. The ranking round, which determined the seeds for all teams, doubled as the ranking round for the individual competition and was held on 16 September 2000. Each archer shot 72 arrows, and the scores of the three archers for each team were summed to give a team ranking round score. A single-elimination head-to-head tournament was held on 22 September. During each round of competition, each archer shot nine arrows for a team score based on 27 arrows. The losers of the semifinals faced off in a bronze medal match, while teams defeated before then were assigned rankings within the group of other teams defeated in their round based on their score in that round.

The South Korean team, which had swept the top three places in the ranking round but had seen each of its members suffer upsets in the individual knock-out rounds, won by comfortable margins in the team knock-out rounds to take the gold medal. The trio set a new world record for a 27-arrow team match in the quarterfinals, with a score of 258 of a possible 270. Italy and Russia each managed to defeat two higher-seeded teams before falling to the Koreans; this gave Italy the silver medal and put Russia in the bronze medal match against the United States. The Russians forced the first Olympic team match tiebreaker against the Americans in that match, losing 29-26 in that tiebreaker.

Ranking round
The ranking for the men's teams was determined by summing the ranking round scores of the three members.

Knockout stage

In the first team round tie-breaker in Olympic archery history, the United States won the bronze medal, defeating Russia by shooting a near-perfect 29 to the Russians' 26.

References

Sources
 Official Report
 

Archery at the 2000 Summer Olympics
Men's events at the 2000 Summer Olympics